Mount Proteus is a  mountain summit in British Columbia, Canada.

Description

Mount Proteus is located in the Battle Range of the Selkirk Mountains. Precipitation runoff from the mountain drains north to Battle Brook which is a tributary of the Incomappleux River, and east into Houston Creek which is a tributary of the Duncan River.

History
The mountain is named for Proteus, the mythological Greek sea god who was difficult to identify or lay hold of because of his ability to change character, which is also an attribute of this mountain. The mountain's toponym was officially adopted on November 1, 1963, by the Geographical Names Board of Canada.

The first ascent of the summit was made in 1947 by Norman Brewster, Andrew J. Kauffman II, and his wife Betty.

Climate

Based on the Köppen climate classification, Mount Proteus is located in a subarctic climate zone with cold, snowy winters, and mild summers. Winter temperatures can drop below −20 °C with wind chill factors below −30 °C. This climate supports the Proteus Glacier on the west slope and Moby Dick Glacier on the east slope of the peak.

See also
Geography of British Columbia

Moby Dick Mountain

References

External links
 Mount Proteus: Weather forecast
 Mount Proteus Rock Climbing: Mountainproject.com
 Mount Proteus (photo): Mountainproject.com

Three-thousanders of British Columbia
Selkirk Mountains
Kootenay Land District